Rockoon is the fourth studio album by Japanese Jazz fusion band T-Square (then known as The Square). It was released on April 1, 1980.

Takeshi Itoh (saxophone player) had begun to use the Lyricon (a Woodwind Synthesizer) in their albums from 1980 until 1987. He switched to Yamaha WX11 and finally to AKAI EWIs in 1988 and has since been using EWIs as a secondary wind instrument.

Track listing

Personnel 
Masahiro Andoh – guitars
Takeshi Itoh – alto saxophone, flute, Lyricon and vocoder
Daisaku Kume – keyboards and synthesizer arrangements
Yuhji Nakamura – bass guitar and Moog bass
Jun Aoyama – drums
Kiyohiko Semba – percussion and vocals
Masato Kohara – vocals on "Really Love", "Come Back", and "It's Happening Again"

References

T-Square (band) albums
1980 albums